Sarsia is a genus of hydrozoan in the family Corynidae.

Species
 Sarsia angulata (Mayer, 1900)
 Sarsia apicula (Murbach & Shearer, 1902)
 Sarsia bella Brinckmann-Voss, 2000
 Sarsia brachygaster Grönberg, 1898
 Sarsia conica (Haeckel, 1880)
 Sarsia densa (Hartlaub, 1897)
 Sarsia erythrops Romanes, 1876
 Sarsia frutescens (Allman, 1872)
 Sarsia hargitti Mayer, 1910
 Sarsia lovenii (M. Sars, 1846)
 Sarsia medelae Gili, Lopez-Gonzalez & Bouillon, 2006
 Sarsia minima von Lendenfeld, 1885
 Sarsia nana Stechow, 1923
 Sarsia occidentalis (Fewkes, 1899)
 Sarsia occulta Edwards, 1978
 Sarsia ocellata Busch, 1851
 Sarsia piriforma Edwards, 1983
 Sarsia princeps (Haeckel, 1879)
 Sarsia pulchella (Allman, 1865)
 Sarsia pulchella Forbes, 1848
 Sarsia striata Edwards, 1983
 Sarsia tubulosa (M. Sars, 1835)
 Sarsia turricula McCrady, 1859
 Sarsia viridis Brinckmann-Voss, 1980

References

Corynidae
Hydrozoan genera